Shuidonggou is an archaeological site and tourist attraction in Yinchuan, Ningxia. It is the earliest paleolithic site in China, dating from over 30,000 years ago, and one of the AAAAA Tourist Attractions of China, a list of the most important and best-maintained tourist attractions in the People's Republic of China.

History
Human occupation of the site took place in the Late Pleistocene to Middle Holocene. Over 50,000 individual items have been collected from the site.

A section of the Great Wall of China lies within the site.

Discovery
A paleontologist from Belgium was the first to discover the site in 1920, finding a Rhinoceros fossil and stone tools. His discovery was followed up by a formal excavation in 1923 and successive excavations since.

References 

Archaeological sites in China
Paleolithic sites in China
Tourist attractions in Ningxia